Friedrich Ludwig Franz Reichsfreiherr von Wangen zu Geroldseck (1727–1782) was the Prince-Bishop of Basel from 1775 to 1782.

Biography

Friedrich Ludwig Franz Reichsfreiherr von Wangen zu Geroldseck was born in Wilwisheim on 12 May 1727.

He was ordained as a priest on 15 March 1766.

On 29 May 1775 the cathedral chapter of Basel Münster elected him to be the new Prince-Bishop of Basel, with Pope Pius VI confirming his appointment on 13 November 1775.  He was consecrated as bishop by Jean-Baptiste-Joseph Gobel, auxiliary bishop of Basel, on 3 March 1776.

He died on 11 November 1782.

References

External link

1727 births
1782 deaths
Prince-Bishops of Basel